Sonia Marta Mora Escalante (born July 1, 1953) is a Costa Rican education administrator who has been Costa Rica's Minister of Education since 2014. Previously she was the Dean of Universidad Nacional de Costa Rica and President of SINAES.

References

1953 births
Costa Rican politicians
Living people
People from San José, Costa Rica